South Beds Golf Club is a golf club in Galley Hill, near Bramingham and north of Luton, Bedfordshire, England. It was established in 1893 and is ranked as the fourth best golf course in the county by the website Top 100 Golf Courses.

References

External links
Official site

Golf clubs and courses in Bedfordshire
1893 establishments in England